The Songshan–Xindian or Green line (code G) is a metro line in Taipei operated by Taipei Metro, named after the districts it connects: Songshan and Xindian. Parts of the line runs under the Roosevelt Road, following the route of the former Xindian (Hsintien) railway line, which ceased service in 1965 on its southern section.

History

 January 1991: Construction began on the Xindian line.
 21 November 1997: The Songshan-Ximen section is approved by the Executive Yuan.
 31 August 2000: The segment between Chiang Kai-shek Memorial Hall and  opened for service (as the Xiaonanmen Line).
 29 September 2004: The Xiaobitan branch line opened for service.
 19 August 2006: Construction begins on the Songshan-Ximen section.
 December 2008: During underground excavation along Nanjing East Road, Section 3, underground support (anchors) for several nearby buildings were discovered. Structural concerns resulted in a temporary suspension of excavation and construction.
 14 January 2009: The city government announced that the building anchors would not affect the opening of the Songshan-Ximen section.
 15 November 2014: With the opening of Songshan section, trains run between Songshan and Xindian stations, forming the current Songshan–Xindian line. Tamsui-Xindian services ended and the Xiaonanmen line merged with the current Songshan–Xindian line.

Tianshui Road station
However, the Circle was suffering from economic concerns, as well as engineering feasibility and effectiveness problems. Coupled with problems with landowners regarding joint developments and two of the entrances/exits, plans for the station were shelved on 1 May 2007. The station would have been a five-level underground station with stacked, split platforms.

Construction of Songshan section
It was originally estimated that its opening would take place in 2013.

Shield tunneling was used to construct most of the tunnels on the line, except for a few locations. Tunneling beneath Dacheng St. crosses existing Taiwan Railway Administration and Taiwan High Speed Rail tunnels. Common utility ducts were constructed in sync with the Metro line, carrying water pipes, gas pipes, and cables. Over 200 homes were demolished or relocated to make way for Metro land use.

Construction of the line was divided into three civil engineering section contracts and one electrical/mechanical system-wide contract. The contract for construction on the eastern end of the line (including  and ) was awarded to Da Cin Construction Co., Ltd. on 2 March 2006. The -long section includes a crossover section, a tail-track work shaft, and three shield tunnels. Construction of the line was completed in late 2014.

In 2008, steel price increases threatened to delay construction plans due to the price doubling over the previous two years. The Ministry of Economic Affairs ordered that exports of other steel products be strictly supervised to ensure a steady local supply and to keep prices down.

Taipei Workshop, a 3rd level historical monument constructed during the era of Japanese rule, was exactly where the proposed  station would be located. Thus, a temporary removal project commenced on 20 October 2006 to move the structure until construction of both the Songshan Line and the Taoyuan International Airport MRT are completed. The building moved 30 meters to the southeast, and moved back when construction is completed.

Services 
As of December 2017, the typical off-peak service is:

Stations 
 M - Main line
 B - Branch Line

See also
 Xiaobitan branch line

Notes

References

Taipei Metro